Chang Yi (born Chang Po-shen on 24 February 1945) is a Hong Kong actor and director originally from Huizhou, China. He has appeared in over 90 films, mostly martial arts films under the Shaw Brothers Studio. Since the 1980s he mostly acted in television and appeared in over 20 TV series.

He currently resides in Greater Vancouver in Canada.

Filmography

Film

References

External links

20th-century Hong Kong male actors
21st-century Hong Kong male actors
Hong Kong male film actors
Hong Kong male television actors
Male actors from Guangdong
Hong Kong people of Hakka descent
People from Huizhou
1945 births
Living people
Chinese male film actors
Chinese male television actors
20th-century Chinese male actors
21st-century Chinese male actors